Hayato Sueyoshi (born 22 June 1982) is a Japanese short track speed skater. He competed in the men's 1500 metres event at the 2006 Winter Olympics.

References

1982 births
Living people
Japanese male short track speed skaters
Olympic short track speed skaters of Japan
Short track speed skaters at the 2006 Winter Olympics
Sportspeople from Osaka Prefecture
Asian Games medalists in short track speed skating
Short track speed skaters at the 1999 Asian Winter Games
Short track speed skaters at the 2003 Asian Winter Games
Medalists at the 2003 Asian Winter Games
Asian Games bronze medalists for Japan